Patria  may refer to:

Entertainment
 Patria (novel), a 2016 novel by Spanish writer Fernando Aramburu
 Patria (TV series), a 2020 limited television series, based on the novel
 Patria (serial), a 1917 American serial film

Music
 "Pátria", the national anthem of East Timor
 Patria (theatre), a cycle of theatrical works by composer R. Murray Schafer

Organizations
 National Pro Patria Party,  El Salvadoran political party from 1931 to 1944
 Pro Patria Union, Estonian political party from 1995 to 2006 
 Patria (company), of Finland

Military
 Patria AMV, a Finnish armored modular vehicle made by Patria
 Patria Pasi, a Finnish armored personnel carrier made by Patria

 Patria submachine gun, an Argentine submachine gun

Ships
 , a steamship
 Sinking of the SS Patria off Haifa, Israel, due to a bomb in 1940, see Patria disaster
 ARA Patria, a light cruiser that served in the Argentine Navy between 1894 and 1927

Other uses
 Homeland (from Latin patria, "fatherland")
 1347 Patria, asteroid
 Patria (newspaper), a Cuban newspaper
 Patria, the Mexican name of the NDV-HXP-S Covid-19 vaccine

See also
 Aurora Pro Patria 1919, an Italian association football club, based in Busto Arsizio, Lombardy